The IKE Group is a research group at the Department of Business Studies, Aalborg University, Denmark and is central part of the Danish Research Unit for Industrial Dynamics (DRUID) founded in 1995 by the IKE Group and scholars from the Department of Industrial Economics and Strategy, Copenhagen Business School. The coordination of this research group has been in the hands of Bengt-Åke Lundvall.

More recently, the IKE Group has been the main architect behind GLOBELICS - a network of scholars who apply the concept ‘systems of innovation and competence building’ as their analytical framework. The groups is also among the central members in the DIME Network of Excellence funded by the European Commission.

The IKE Group does research on economic, technical and institutional change. The main research themes include economic evolutionary modelling, theory of the firm, national systems of innovation, international trade and competitiveness and the interplay between economic and ecological issues.

Research Themes 

The focus of the research group is on innovation, knowledge and economic dynamics at different levels of aggregation. Common for the approach is that economic development is seen as knowledge driven and that knowledge creation and innovation are seen as reflecting processes of interactive learning within systemic frameworks. The group has made major contributions to the innovation system and the learning economy concepts. The main four research themes are:

1. Knowledge, innovation and regional dynamics

2. Economic development in the globalising learning economy

3. Competition, organisational change and economic transformation

4. Economics of knowledge, innovation and evolution

Certain issues such as financing of innovation, innovation indicators and innovation policy are central to the research program as a whole and cut across the themes.

Teaching 
Besides research is the IKE-group involved in teaching in the following English spoken master programs:

1. Msc. Innovation, Knowledge and Economic Dynamics (MIKE-E)

2. Msc. Innovation, Knowledge and Entrepreneurial Dynamics (MIKE-B)

3. The European Inter-University Association on Society, Science and Technology ESST

External links 
Aalborg University homepage
the IKE Group homepage
the MIKE education homepage
DRUID homepage
Globelics homepage

Universities in Denmark
Aalborg University